The Hamilton Branch is a historic railway in Scotland, running from the Newton railway station to Ross Junction with the Caledonian Railway Coalburn Branch.

History
 17 September 1849 – Opened between Newton and Hamilton
 29 May 1876 – Opened between Hamilton and Ross Junction

Connections to other lines
 Coalburn Branch at Ross Junction
 Hamilton and Strathaven Railway (and onwards to the Busby Railway) at Hamilton West railway station
 Clydesdale Junction Railway, Glasgow Central Railway and Lanarkshire and Ayrshire Railway at Newton railway station

Current operations
The line is open as part of the Argyle Line.

References

External links
RAILSCOT on Hamilton Branch

Caledonian Railway
Pre-grouping British railway companies
Early Scottish railway companies
Railway lines opened in 1849
1849 establishments in Scotland